San Giorgio dei Greci is a church in the sestiere (neighborhood) of Castello, Venice, northern Italy. It was the center of the Scuola dei Greci, the Confraternity of the Greeks in Venice.  Around this period there was a similar church in Naples called Santi Pietro e Paolo dei Greci.  There was also a Greek Brotherhood of Naples.

For centuries, despite the close ties of Venice to the Byzantine world (Venice has been part of the Byzantine Empire), the Greek Orthodox rite was not permitted in Venice. In 1498, the Greek community in Venice gained the right to found the Scuola de San Nicolò dei Greci, a confraternity which aided members of that community. In 1539, after protracted negotiations, the papacy allowed the construction of the church of San Giorgio, financed by a tax on all ships from the Orthodox world.

Construction was started by Sante Lombardo, and from 1548, by Giannantonio Chiona. The belltower was built in 1592. The interior has a monument to Gabriele Seviros (1619) by Baldassarre Longhena. The dome of the church was frescoed with the Last Judgement (1589–93) by Giovanni Kyprios. Other artists who completed work for the church were Markos Bathas, Thomas Bathas, Venediktos Emporios, and Michael Damaskinos. Emanuele Tzane-Buniales, a priest and hagiographer from Crete.  Tzanes frescoed the Saints Simeon and Alypios, ascetic hermits, atop the pilasters.  Other famous Greek artists associated with the church were: Konstantinos Tzanes, Philotheos Skoufos, Ioannis Moskos, Leos Moskos and Emmanuel Tzanfournaris.

Amongst the treasures in this church are three icons which Anna Notaras, daughter of Loukas Notaras, the last megas doux of the Byzantine Empire, brought with her to Italy before 1453, and she later gave to the Scuola de San Nicolò dei Greci in trust for when a church observing the Greek Orthodox faith could be constructed. These icons comprise: one of Christ in His glory surrounded by symbols of the four Evangelists and figures of the 12 Apostles; another of Christ Pantokrator; and the third is an image of the Virgin Hodegetria.

Near the church lies the Flanginian School, a Greek teachers' school, which today houses the Hellenic Institute of Byzantine and Post-Byzantine Studies in Venice. The Museum was established by Sophia Antoniadis.

Michael Damaskinos 

Between 1560–1583, Michael Damaskinos completed works for the church.  Twenty-five of his major works are located in Venice.  Twenty of his paintings are part of San Giorgio dei Greci.  Eighteen of his icons are part of the iconostasis of the church.  One of them portrays the Archangel Michael.  Nine of the paintings exhibit the dodekaorto known as the Great feasts in the Eastern Orthodox Church.  Two of his works are behind the iconostasis within the holy sanctuary.  Four of his works are part of the Hellenic Institute of Venice.  The museum and research facility is associated with San Giorgio dei Greci.  One of his paintings Wedding at Cana is located at the Museo Correr in Venice.

Emmanuel Tzanes 
  One of the most important eras in San Giorgio dei Greci's history is the period when world-renowned painter Emmanuel Tzanes was a priest at the institution.  He was associated with the church from 1655–1690.  Some of his most important works were completed while he was in Venice.  One such work was Lady the Lambovitissa completed in 1684.  His brother's famous painter Konstantinos Tzanes and poet Marinos Tzanes were with him.  They were also affiliated with the church.  During this era Greek painters Ioannis Moskos, Leos Moskos and Philotheos Skoufos were also involved with the church. Four of Emmanuel's works are associated with San Giorgio dei Greci.
Emmanuel completed an icon of Alypius for the iconostasis.  He painted Abraham and Melchizedek for the door panels of the royal doors.  He completed a Crucifixion for the church. Finally, he also painted Jesus, the Virgin Mary, and John the Baptist on a holy podium (proskinitirio) for the church.  Thirteen of his paintings are housed at the Hellenic Institute of Venice. The museum and research facility are associated with San Giorgio dei Greci. One of his paintings of Saint Spyridon is located at the Museo Correr in Venice.

Priests 1527–1868

Other Greek Churches in Italy 
Santi Pietro e Paolo dei Greci
Greek Orthodox Church of San Nicolò dei Greci
Chiesa Greco Ortodossa di Sant'Andrea Apostolo, Rome Italy

See also 
Theodore Palaiologos (stratiote)

References

Bibliography 

 Mathieu Grenet, La fabrique communautaire. Les Grecs à Venise, Livourne et Marseille, 1770–1840, Athens and Rome, École française d'Athènes and École française de Rome, 2016

External links 
 Archdiocese of Italy (Patriarchate of Constantinople)
 Hellenic Institute of Byzantine and Post-Byzantine studies in Venice
Dome of Church

1539 establishments in the Republic of Venice
Religious buildings and structures completed in 1592
Towers completed in 1592
Churches in Venice
16th-century Eastern Orthodox church buildings
Bell towers in Italy
Inclined towers
Renaissance architecture in Venice
Greek Orthodox cathedrals in Europe
Cathedrals in Italy
Greek Orthodox churches in Italy